Mathieu Amalric (born 25 October 1965) is a French actor and filmmaker. He is best known internationally for his roles in the James Bond film Quantum of Solace, in which he played the lead villain, Steven Spielberg's Munich, Wes Anderson's The Grand Budapest Hotel and The French Dispatch,  and for his lead performance in The Diving Bell and the Butterfly, for which he drew critical acclaim. He has also won several César Awards and the Lumières Award.

Early life
Amalric was born on 25 October 1965 in Neuilly-sur-Seine, a suburb of Paris, the son of journalists Nicole Zand, a literary critic for Le Monde, and Jacques Amalric, who worked as a foreign affairs editor for Le Monde and Libération. Amalric's father was French, while his mother was born in Poland, to Jewish parents, and moved to France at the outbreak of World War II.

Career
Amalric first gained fame in the film Ma Vie Sexuelle (My Sex Life...or How I Got Into an Argument), for which he won a César Award.

In 2007, he starred in the critically acclaimed movie The Diving Bell and the Butterfly, portraying  Jean-Dominique Bauby, a journalist who created his own system of communication after a stroke left him suffering from locked-in syndrome. Amalric's performance was universally acclaimed, and he won the Cesar Award for Best Actor.

He was selected to play the James Bond villain Dominic Greene alongside Daniel Craig (with whom he had previously starred in Munich) in the 2008 film Quantum of Solace.

His 2010 film, On Tour, premiered at the 2010 Cannes Film Festival and won Amalric the Best Director Award.

The 2014 film The Blue Room, which he directed and starred in, was selected to compete in the Un Certain Regard section at the 2014 Cannes Film Festival.

Personal life
Amalric has three sons, two with his ex-wife Jeanne Balibar, and one with his former partner, a writer.  As of 2019, he is in a long-term relationship with Canadian soprano Barbara Hannigan.

He supports the Girondins de Bordeaux football club.

Filmography

As actor

As filmmaker

References

External links 

1965 births
Living people
Jewish French male actors
People from Neuilly-sur-Seine
French Ashkenazi Jews
French people of Polish-Jewish descent
Cannes Film Festival Award for Best Director winners
Most Promising Actor César Award winners
Best Actor César Award winners
Best Actor Lumières Award winners
French film directors
French male screenwriters
French screenwriters
French male film actors
French male television actors
20th-century French male actors
21st-century French male actors
French film producers
French male stage actors
French-language film directors